Alfred Meyer-Waldeck (27 November 1864 – 25 August 1928) was a vice admiral in the Imperial German Navy from 1909 to 1914. He was most notable as the lead naval commander in the Siege of Tsingtao during World War I and the final governor of the Kiautschou Bay concession from 1911 to 1914.

References

External links
 

1864 births
1928 deaths
Imperial German Navy admirals of World War I
Military personnel from Saint Petersburg
German military personnel of the Boxer Rebellion